Cindy Carr is an American set decorator. She has been nominated for two Academy Awards in the category Best Art Direction.

Selected filmography
 The Fisher King (1991)
 What Dreams May Come (1998)

References

External links

Year of birth missing (living people)
Living people
American set decorators